Belhara  is a village development committee in Dhankuta District in the Province No. 1 of eastern Nepal. At the time of the 1991 Nepal census it had a population of 4857 people living in 874 individual households. The center part of it is called Guthitaar Bazzar. The main source of income of this area is tomato, capsicum and orange production.

References

Populated places in Dhankuta District